

Events

Pre-1600
1568 – The Spanish Duke of Alba defeats a Dutch rebel force under William the Silent. 
1572 – Eighty Years' War: Three thousand Spanish soldiers wade through fifteen miles of water in one night to effect the relief of Goes.

1601–1900
1740 – France, Prussia, Bavaria and Saxony refuse to honour the Pragmatic Sanction, and the War of the Austrian Succession begins.
1774 – American Revolution: The Continental Association, a nonconsumption and nonimportation agreement against the British Isles and the British West Indies, is adopted by the First Continental Congress. 
1781 – The Patent of Toleration, providing limited freedom of worship, is approved in Austria.
1803 – The United States Senate ratifies the Louisiana Purchase.
1818 – The Convention of 1818 is signed between the United States and the United Kingdom, which settles the Canada–United States border on the 49th parallel for most of its length.
1827 – Greek War of Independence: In the Battle of Navarino, a combined Turkish and Egyptian fleet is defeated by British, French and Russian naval forces in the last significant battle fought with wooden sailing ships.
1883 – Peru and Chile sign the Treaty of Ancón, by which the Tarapacá province is ceded to the latter, bringing an end to Peru's involvement in the War of the Pacific.

1901–present
1904 – Chile and Bolivia sign the Treaty of Peace and Friendship, delimiting the border between the two countries.
1935 – The Long March, a mammoth retreat undertaken by the armed forces of the Chinese Communist Party a year prior, ends.
1941 – World War II: Thousands of civilians in German-occupied Serbia are murdered in the Kragujevac massacre.
1944 – World War II: The Soviet Red Army and Yugoslav Partisans liberate Belgrade.
  1944   – Liquefied natural gas leaks from storage tanks in Cleveland and then explodes, leveling 30 blocks and killing 130 people.
  1944   – American general Douglas MacArthur fulfills his promise to return to the Philippines when he comes ashore during the Battle of Leyte.
1947 – Cold War: The House Un-American Activities Committee begins its investigation into Communist infiltration of the Hollywood film industry, resulting in a blacklist that prevents some from working in the industry for years.
1951 – The "Johnny Bright incident" occurs during a football game between the Drake Bulldogs and Oklahoma A&M Aggies.
1952 – The Governor of Kenya Evelyn Baring declares a state of emergency and begins arresting hundreds of suspected leaders of the Mau Mau Uprising.
1961 – The Soviet Navy performs the first armed test of a submarine-launched ballistic missile, launching an R-13 from a Golf-class submarine.
1962 – China launches simultaneous offensives in Ladakh and across the McMahon Line, igniting the Sino-Indian War.
1973 – Watergate scandal: "Saturday Night Massacre": United States President Richard Nixon fires U.S. Attorney General Elliot Richardson and Deputy Attorney General William Ruckelshaus after they refuse to fire special prosecutor Archibald Cox, who is finally fired by Solicitor General Robert Bork.
  1973   – The Sydney Opera House is opened by Elizabeth II after 14 years of construction.
1976 – The Luling–Destrehan Ferry MV George Prince is struck by the Norwegian freighter SS Frosta while crossing the Mississippi River in St. Charles Parish, Louisiana. Seventy-eight passengers and crew die, and only 18 people aboard the ferry survive.
1977 – A plane carrying the rock band Lynyrd Skynyrd crashes in woodland in Mississippi, United States. Six people, including three band members, are killed.
1981 – Two police officers and a Brink's armored car guard are killed during an armed robbery carried out by members of the Black Liberation Army and Weather Underground in Nanuet, New York. 
1982 – During the UEFA Cup match between FC Spartak Moscow and HFC Haarlem, 66 people are crushed to death in the Luzhniki disaster.
1986 – Aeroflot Flight 6502 crashes while landing at Kuibyshev Airport (now Kuromoch International Airport) in Kuibyshev (now present-day Samara, Russia), killing 70 people.
1991 – A 6.8 Mw earthquake strikes the Uttarkashi region of India, killing more than 1,000 people.
1991 – A massive firestorm breaks out in the hills of Oakland and Berkeley, California killing 25 people and destroying more than 3,000 homes, apartments and condominiums. 
2003 – The Sloan Great Wall, once the largest cosmic structure known to humanity, is discovered by students at Princeton University.
2011 – Libyan Crisis: Rebel forces capture Libyan dictator Muammar Gaddafi and his son Mutassim in his hometown of Sirte and kill him shortly thereafter, ending the first Libyan civil war.
2017 – Syrian civil war: The Syrian Democratic Forces (SDF) declare victory in the Raqqa campaign.
2022 – Liz Truss steps down as British Prime Minister and leader of the Conservative Party amid the country's political crisis, serving for 45 days before resigning, serving for the least time of any British Prime Minister [45 days].

Births

Pre-1600
888 – Zhu Youzhen, emperor of Later Liang (d. 923)
1475 – Giovanni di Bernardo Rucellai, Italian poet and playwright (d. 1525)
1496 – Claude, Duke of Guise (d. 1550)
1554 – Bálint Balassi, Hungarian writer and noble (d. 1594)

1601–1900
1612 – Richard Boyle, 1st Earl of Burlington, Anglo-Irish nobleman, Lord High Treasurer of Ireland, Cavalier (d. 1698)
1616 – Thomas Bartholin, Danish physician, mathematician, and theologian (d. 1680)
1620 – Aelbert Cuyp, Dutch painter (d. 1691)
1632 – Christopher Wren, English physicist, mathematician, and architect, designed St Paul's Cathedral (d. 1723)
  1632   – Edward Hungerford, English politician (d. 1711)
1660 – Robert Bertie, 1st Duke of Ancaster and Kesteven, English politician, Chancellor of the Duchy of Lancaster (d. 1723)
1677 – Stanisław Leszczyński, King of Poland (d. 1766)
1711 – Timothy Ruggles, American lawyer, jurist, and politician, (d. 1795)
1718 – Catherine Gordon, Duchess of Gordon, Scottish aristocrat (d. 1779) 
1719 – Gottfried Achenwall, German historian, economist, and jurist (d. 1772)
1740 – Isabelle de Charrière, Dutch author and poet (d. 1805)
1759 – Chauncey Goodrich, American lawyer and politician, 8th Lieutenant Governor of Connecticut (d. 1815)
1780 – Pauline Bonaparte, French sister of Napoleon (d. 1825)
1784 – Henry John Temple, 3rd Viscount Palmerston, English academic and politician, Prime Minister of the United Kingdom (d. 1865)
1785 – George Ormerod, English historian and author (d. 1873)
1790 – Patrick Matthew. Scottish farmer and biologist (d. 1874)
1801 – Melchior Berri, Swiss architect and educator, designed the Natural History Museum of Basel (d. 1854)
1808 – Karl Andree, German geographer and journalist (d. 1875)
1819 – Báb, Iranian religious leader, founded Bábism (d. 1850)
1822 – Thomas Hughes, English lawyer and judge (d. 1896)
1832 – Constantin Lipsius, German architect and theorist (d. 1894)
1847 – Frits Thaulow, Norwegian painter (d. 1906)
1854 – Arthur Rimbaud, French soldier and poet (d. 1891)
1858 – John Burns, English union leader and politician, President of the Board of Trade (d. 1943)
1859 – John Dewey, American psychologist and philosopher (d. 1952)
1864 – James F. Hinkle, American banker and politician, 6th Governor of New Mexico (d. 1951)
1873 – Nellie McClung, Canadian author and suffragist (d. 1951)
1874 – Charles Ives, American composer (d. 1954)
1882 – Margaret Dumont, American actress (d. 1965)
  1882   – Bela Lugosi, Hungarian-American actor (d. 1956)
1887 – Prince Yasuhiko Asaka of Japan (d. 1981)
1889 – Johann Gruber, Austrian priest and saint (d. 1944)
1890 – Aleksander Maaker, Estonian bagpipe player (d. 1968)
1891 – Samuel Flagg Bemis, American historian and author (d. 1973)
  1891   – James Chadwick, English physicist and academic, Nobel Prize laureate (d. 1974)
1893 – Charley Chase, American actor, director, and screenwriter (d. 1940)
1894 – Olive Thomas, American model and actress (d. 1920)
1895 – Rex Ingram, American actor (d. 1969)
  1895   – Morrie Ryskind, American writer/director (d. 1985)
1897 – Yi Un, South Korean general (d. 1970)
1900 – Ismail al-Azhari, Sudanese politician, 3rd President of Sudan (d. 1969)
  1900   – Wayne Morse, American lieutenant, lawyer, and politician (d. 1974)

1901–present
1901 – Frank Churchill, American film composer (d. 1942)
  1901   – Adelaide Hall, American-English singer, actress, and dancer (d. 1993)
1904 – Tommy Douglas, Scottish-Canadian minister and politician, 7th Premier of Saskatchewan (d. 1986)
  1904   – Enolia McMillan, American educator and activist (d. 2006)
  1904   – Anna Neagle, English actress, singer, and producer (d. 1986)
1907 – Arlene Francis, American actress and television personality (d. 2001)
1908 – Stuart Hamblen, American singer-songwriter, actor, and radio show host (d. 1989) 
1909 – Carla Laemmle, American actress and photographer (d. 2014)
  1909   – Yasushi Sugiyama, Japanese painter (d. 1993)
1910 – Chen Liting, Chinese director and playwright (d. 2013)
1912 – Ruhi Su, Turkish singer-songwriter (d. 1985)
1913 – Grandpa Jones, American singer-songwriter and banjo player (d. 1998)
1914 – Fayard Nicholas, American actor, dancer, and choreographer (d. 2006)
1917 – Stéphane Hessel, German-French activist and diplomat (d. 2013)
  1917   – Ants "the Terrible" Kaljurand, Estonian anti-communist, freedom fighter and forest brother (d. 1951)
  1917   – Jean-Pierre Melville, French actor, director, producer, and screenwriter (d. 1973)
1918 – Martin Drewes, German soldier and pilot (d. 2013)
  1918   – Robert Lochner, American-German soldier and journalist (d. 2003)
1919 – Tracy Hall, American chemist and academic (d. 2008)
1920 – Nick Cardy, American illustrator (d. 2013)
  1920   – Fanny de Sivers, Estonian-French linguist and academic (d. 2011)
  1920   – Siddhartha Shankar Ray, Indian lawyer and politician, Chief Minister of West Bengal (d. 2010)
  1920   – Janet Jagan, 6th President of Guyana (d. 2009)
1921 – Manny Ayulo, American race car driver (d. 1955)
  1921   – Hans Warren, Dutch poet and author (d. 2001)
1922 – John Anderson, American actor (d. 1992)
  1922   – Franco Ventriglia, American opera singer (d. 2012)
1923 – Robert Craft, American conductor and musicologist (d. 2015)
1924 – Robert Peters, American poet, playwright, and critic (d. 2014)
1925 – Art Buchwald, American soldier and journalist (d. 2007)
  1925   – Tom Dowd, American record producer and engineer (d. 2002)
  1925   – Roger Hanin, Algerian-French actor, director, and screenwriter (d. 2015)
1926 – Edward Douglas-Scott-Montagu, 3rd Baron Montagu of Beaulieu, English lieutenant and politician, founded the National Motor Museum (d. 2015)
1927 – Joyce Brothers, American psychologist, author, and actress (d. 2013)
  1927   – Gunturu Seshendra Sarma, Indian poet and critic (d. 2007)
1928 – Michael O'Donnell, English physician, author, and journalist (d. 2019)
1931 – Richard Caliguiri, American lawyer and politician, 54th Mayor of Pittsburgh (d. 1988)
  1931   – Mickey Mantle, American baseball player and sportscaster (d. 1995)
  1931   – Ken Morrison, English businessman (d. 2017)
1932 – Rosey Brown, American football player and coach (d. 2004)
  1932   – William Christopher, American actor and singer (d. 2016)
  1932   – Rokurō Naya, Japanese voice actor (d. 2014)
1933 – Barrie Chase, American actress and dancer
1934 – Bill Chase, American trumpet player (d. 1974)
  1934   – Eddie Harris, American saxophonist (d. 1996)
  1935   – Jerry Orbach, American actor and singer (d. 2004)
1937 – Cancio Garcia, Filipino lawyer and jurist (d. 2013)
  1937   – Wanda Jackson, American singer-songwriter and guitarist
  1937   – Juan Marichal, Dominican baseball player and sportscaster
  1937   – Emma Tennant, English author (d. 2017)
1938 – Emidio Greco, Italian director and screenwriter (d. 2012)
  1938   – Iain Macmillan, Scottish photographer and educator (d. 2006)
1939 – Patrick Hughes, English painter, illustrator, and photographer
1940 – Kathy Kirby, English singer (d. 2011)
  1940   – Robert Pinsky, American poet and critic
  1940   – Jean-Pierre Dikongué Pipa, Cameroonian filmmaker
1941 – Anneke Wills, English actress
1942 – Earl Hindman, American actor (d. 2003)
  1942   – Christiane Nüsslein-Volhard, German biologist and geneticist, Nobel Prize laureate
  1942   – Bart Zoet, Dutch cyclist (d. 1992)
1943 – Dunja Vejzović, Croatian soprano and actress
1944 – Nalin de Silva, Sri Lankan physicist and philosopher
  1944   – David Mancuso, American party planner, created The Loft (d. 2016)
1945 – Ric Lee, English drummer
1946 – Diana Gittins, American-English sociologist, author, and academic
  1946   – Lewis Grizzard, American comedian and author (d. 1994)
  1946   – Elfriede Jelinek, Austrian author and playwright, Nobel Prize laureate
  1946   – Richard Loncraine, English director and screenwriter
  1946   – Lucien Van Impe, Belgian cyclist
  1946   – Chris Woodhead, English civil servant and academic (d. 2015)
1948 – Peter Combe, Australian entertainer
  1948   – Sandra Dickinson, American-English actress and composer
  1948   – Piet Hein Donner, Dutch jurist and politician, Dutch Minister of Justice
  1948   – Melih Gökçek, Turkish journalist and politician, Mayor of Ankara
1949 – Valeriy Borzov, Ukrainian-Russian sprinter
1950 – Tom Petty, American singer-songwriter, guitarist, and producer (d. 2017)
  1950   – William Russ, American actor and director
1951 – Al Greenwood, American keyboard player
  1951   – Patrick Hall, English lawyer and politician
  1951   – Ken Ham, Australian-American evangelist
  1951   – Leif Pagrotsky, Swedish businessman and politician
  1951   – Claudio Ranieri, Italian footballer and manager
1952 – Melanie Mayron, American actress and director
  1952   – Derek Ridgers, English photographer and art director
  1952   – Wilma Josefina Salgado, Ecuadorian politician and economist
1953 – Keith Hernandez, American baseball player and sportscaster
  1953   – Richard McWilliam, American businessman and philanthropist, co-founded the Upper Deck Company (d. 2013)
  1953   – Bill Nunn, American actor (d. 2016)
1954 – Steve Orich, American composer and conductor
1955 – Thomas Newman, American composer and conductor
  1955   – David Profumo, English author and academic
  1955   – Aaron Pryor, American boxer (d. 2016)
  1955   – Sheldon Whitehouse, American politician
1956 – Danny Boyle, English director, producer, and screenwriter
  1956   – Martin Taylor, English guitarist
1957 – Jane Bonham-Carter, Baroness Bonham-Carter of Yarnbury, English politician
  1957   – Chris Cowdrey, English cricketer and sportscaster
  1957   – Hilda Solis, American academic and politician, 25th United States Secretary of Labor
1958 – Valerie Faris, American director and producer
  1958   – Lynn Flewelling, American author and academic
  1958   – Scott Hall, American wrestler (d. 2022)
  1958   – Mark King, English singer-songwriter and bass player 
  1958   – Dave Krieg, American football player
  1958   – Viggo Mortensen, American-Danish actor and producer
1959 – Mark Little, Australian comedian, actor, and screenwriter
1960 – Konstantin Aseev, Russian chess player and trainer (d. 2004)
1961 – Audun Kleive, Norwegian drummer and composer
  1961   – Kate Mosse, English author and playwright
  1961   – Ian Rush, Welsh footballer and manager
  1961   – Les Stroud, Canadian director, producer, and harmonica player
  1961   – Michie Tomizawa, Japanese voice actress and singer
1962 – David M. Evans, American director and screenwriter
  1962   – Dave Wong, Hong Kong-Taiwanese singer-songwriter and actor
1963 – Julie Payette, Canadian engineer and astronaut
  1963   – Nikos Tsiantakis, Greek footballer
  1963   – Stan Valckx, Dutch footballer and manager
1964 – Kamala Harris, American politician and lawyer, 49th Vice President of the United States
  1964   – Tomoko Yamaguchi, Japanese actress and singer
1965 – Norman Blake, Scottish singer-songwriter and guitarist
  1965   – Jonathan I. Schwartz, American businessman
  1965   – Mikhail Shtalenkov, Russian ice hockey player
  1965   – William Zabka, American actor and producer
1966 – Abu Musab al-Zarqawi, Jordanian militant Islamist (d. 2006)
  1966   – Allan Donald, South African cricketer and coach
  1966   – Patrick Volkerding, American computer scientist and engineer, founded Slackware
1967 – Elizabeth Carling, English actress and singer
  1967   – Kerrod Walters, Australian rugby league player
  1967   – Kevin Walters, Australian rugby league player and coach
1968 – Susan Tully, English actress, director, and producer
1969 – Laurie Daley, Australian rugby league player and coach
  1969   – Juan González, Puerto Rican-American baseball player
  1969   – Labros Papakostas, Greek high jumper
1970 – Sander Boschker, Dutch footballer
  1970   – Neil Heywood, English-Chinese businessman (d. 2011)
  1970   – Aapo Ilves, Estonian poet and illustrator
  1970   – Michelle Malkin, American blogger and author
1971 – Snoop Dogg, American rapper, producer, and actor
  1971   – Eddie Jones, American basketball player
  1971   – Kamiel Maase, Dutch runner
  1971   – Dannii Minogue, Australian singer-songwriter and actress
1972 – Pie Geelen, Dutch swimmer
  1972   – Will Greenwood, English rugby player and sportscaster
  1972   – Brian Schatz, American academic and politician, 11th Lieutenant Governor of Hawaii
1974 – Bashar Rahal, Emirati-American actor and producer
  1974   – Brian Limond, Scottish comedian and writer
  1974   – Ed Hale, American singer-songwriter, writer and socio-political activist 
1976 – Nikolaos Bacharidis, Greek footballer
  1976   – Dan Fogler, American actor, director, producer, and screenwriter
  1976   – Nicola Legrottaglie, Italian footballer and manager
1977 – Matt Jansen, English footballer and manager
  1977   – Leila Josefowicz, Canadian-American violinist
  1977   – Erko Saviauk, Estonian footballer
  1977   – Sam Witwer, American actor and musician
1978 – Virender Sehwag, Indian cricketer
  1978   – Paul Wilson, Scottish bass player and songwriter 
1979 – Vasyl Baranov, Ukrainian footballer
  1979   – Paul Ifill, English footballer
  1979   – John Krasinski, American actor, director, and producer
  1979   – Paul O'Connell, Irish rugby player
  1979   – Paul Terek, American decathlete
1980 – Chad Robinson, Australian rugby league player (d. 2016)
  1980   – José Veras, Dominican baseball player
1981 – Dimitris Papadopoulos, Greek footballer
  1981   – Francisco Javier Rodríguez, Mexican footballer
1982 – Kristian Bak Nielsen, Danish footballer
  1982   – Becky Brewerton, Welsh golfer
1983 – Flavio Cipolla, Italian tennis player
  1983   – Luis Saritama, Ecuadorian footballer
  1983   – Michel Vorm, Dutch footballer
1984 – Mitch Lucker, American singer-songwriter (d. 2012)
  1984   – Florent Sinama Pongolle, French footballer
  1984   – Andrew Trimble, Irish rugby player
1985 – Dominic McGuire, American basketball player
  1985   – Alphonso Smith, American football player
  1985   – James Sutton, English race car driver
1986 – Wanlop Saechio, Thai footballer
  1986   – Elyse Taylor, Australian model
1987 – Raphael Hackl, German rugby player
1988 – Candice Swanepoel, South African supermodel and philanthropist
1989 – Jess Glynne, English singer-songwriter
1990 – Sam Mataora, Cook Islands rugby league player
1992 – Ksenia Semyonova, Russian gymnast
  1992   – Ferhat Yazgan, Turkish footballer
1996 – Anthony Sinisuka Ginting, Indonesian badminton player
1997 – Andrey Rublev, Russian tennis player
1998 – Jordan Ridley, Australian rules footballer
1999 – Chuu, South Korean singer and television personality

Deaths

Pre-1600
 460 – Aelia Eudocia, Byzantine wife of Theodosius II (b. 401)
 967 – Li Yixing, Chinese governor
1122 – Ralph d'Escures, archbishop of Canterbury
1139 – Henry X, Duke of Bavaria (b. 1108)
1187 – Pope Urban III
1327 – Teresa d'Entença, Countess of Urgell (b. 1300)
1401 – Klaus Störtebeker, German pirate
1423 – Henry Bowet, Archbishop of York
1439 – Ambrose the Camaldulian, Italian theologian
1438 – Jacopo della Quercia, Sienese sculptor (b. c. 1374)
1524 – Thomas Linacre, English physician and scholar (b. 1460)
1538 – Francesco Maria I della Rovere, Duke of Urbino, condottiero (b. 1490)
1570 – João de Barros, Portuguese historian and author (b. 1496)

1601–1900
1602 – Walter Leveson, Elizabethan member of parliament, Shropshire landowner (b. 1550)
1640 – John Ball, English clergyman and theologian (b. 1585)
1652 – Antonio Coello, Spanish poet and playwright (b. 1611)
1713 – Archibald Pitcairne, Scottish physician and academic (b. 1652)
1740 – Charles VI, Holy Roman Emperor (b. 1685)
1865 – Champ Ferguson, American guerrilla leader (b. 1821)
1870 – Michael William Balfe, Irish violinist and composer (b. 1808)
1871 – Karl Christian Ulmann, Latvian-German theologian and academic (b. 1793)
1880 – Lydia Maria Child, American journalist, author, and activist (b. 1802)
1883 – George Chichester, 3rd Marquess of Donegall (b. 1797)
1890 – Richard Francis Burton, English-Italian geographer and explorer (b. 1821) 
1894 – James Anthony Froude, English historian, novelist, biographer and editor (b. 1818)
1900 – Naim Frashëri, Albanian poet and translator (b. 1846)

1901–present
1908 – Vaiben Louis Solomon, Australian politician, 21st Premier of South Australia (b. 1853)
1910 – David B. Hill, American lawyer and politician, 29th Governor of New York (b. 1843)
1926 – Eugene V. Debs, American union leader and politician (b. 1855)
1928 – Jack Peddie, Scottish footballer (b. 1876)
1935 – Arthur Henderson, Scottish-English politician, Secretary of State for Foreign Affairs, Nobel Prize laureate (b. 1863)
1936 – Anne Sullivan, American educator (b. 1866)
1940 – Gunnar Asplund, Swedish architect and academic, co-designed Skogskyrkogården (b. 1885)
1941 – Ken Farnes, English cricketer and soldier (b. 1911)
1950 – Henry L. Stimson, American colonel, lawyer, and politician, 46th United States Secretary of State (b. 1867)
1953 – Werner Baumbach, German colonel and pilot (b. 1916) 
1956 – Lawrence Dale Bell, American industrialist and founder of Bell Aircraft Corporation (b. 1894)
1957 – Michalis Dorizas, Greek-American javelin thrower and football player (b. 1890)
1964 – Herbert Hoover, American engineer and politician, 31st President of the United States (b. 1874)
1967 – Shigeru Yoshida, Japanese politician and diplomat, 32nd Prime Minister of Japan (b. 1878)
1968 – Bud Flanagan, English actor and screenwriter (b. 1896)
1972 – Harlow Shapley, American astronomer and academic (b. 1885)
1977 – Steve Gaines, American guitarist (b. 1949)
  1977   – Ronnie Van Zant, American singer-songwriter (b. 1948)
1978 – Gunnar Nilsson, Swedish race car driver (b. 1948)
1983 – Yves Thériault, Canadian author (b. 1915)
  1983   – Merle Travis, American singer-songwriter and guitarist (b. 1917)
1984 – Carl Ferdinand Cori, Czech-American biochemist and pharmacologist, Nobel Prize laureate (b. 1896)
  1984   – Paul Dirac, English-American physicist and mathematician, Nobel Prize laureate (b. 1902)
1987 – Andrey Kolmogorov, Russian mathematician and academic (b. 1903)
1988 – Sheila Scott, English pilot and author (b. 1922)
1989 – Anthony Quayle, English actor and director (b. 1913)
1990 – Joel McCrea, American actor (b. 1905)
1992 – Werner Torkanowsky, German-American conductor (b. 1926)
1993 – Yasushi Sugiyama, Japanese painter (b. 1909)
1994 – Burt Lancaster, American actor (b. 1913)
1995 – Christopher Stone, American actor, director, and screenwriter (b. 1942)
  1995   – John Tonkin, Australian politician, 20th Premier of Western Australia (b. 1902)
1999 – Calvin Griffith, Canadian-American businessman (b. 1911)
  1999   – Jack Lynch, Irish footballer, lawyer, and politician, 5th Taoiseach of Ireland (b. 1917)
2001 – Ted Ammon, American financier and banker (b. 1949)
2003 – Jack Elam, American actor (b. 1918)
2004 – Anthony Hecht, American poet and educator (b. 1923)
  2004   – Chuck Hiller, American baseball player, coach, and manager (b. 1934)
2005 – Shirley Horn, American singer and pianist (b. 1934)
  2005   – Eva Švankmajerová, Czech painter and poet (b. 1940)
  2005   – André van der Louw, Dutch lawyer and politician, 16th Mayor of Rotterdam (b. 1933)
2006 – Arnold Viiding, Estonian shot putter and discus thrower (b. 1911)
  2006   – Jane Wyatt, American actress (b. 1910)
2007 – Max McGee, American football player and sportscaster (b. 1932)
2008 – Gene Hickerson, American football player (b. 1935)
2010 – W. Cary Edwards, American politician (b. 1944)
  2010   – Bob Guccione, American publisher, founded Penthouse magazine (b. 1930)
  2010   – Eva Ibbotson, Austrian-English author (b. 1925)
  2010   – Max Kohnstamm, Dutch historian and diplomat (b. 1914)
  2010   – Farooq Leghari, Pakistani politician, 8th President of Pakistan (b. 1940)
2011 – Muammar Gaddafi, Libyan colonel and politician, Prime Minister of Libya (b. 1942)
  2011   – Mutassim Gaddafi, Libyan colonel (b. 1977)
  2011   – Abu-Bakr Yunis Jabr, Libyan politician (b. 1942)
2012 – Przemysław Gintrowski, Polish poet and composer (b. 1951)
  2012   – Paul Kurtz, American philosopher and academic (b. 1925)
  2012   – Dave May, American baseball player (b. 1943)
  2012   – John McConnell, American activist, created Earth Day (b. 1915)
  2012   – E. Donnall Thomas, American physician and academic, Nobel Prize laureate (b. 1920)
  2012   – Raymond Watson, American businessman (b. 1926)
2013 – Jovanka Broz, Croatian-Serbian colonel (b. 1924)
  2013   – Don James, American football player and coach (b. 1932)
  2013   – Lawrence Klein, American economist and academic, Nobel Prize laureate (b. 1920)
  2013   – Joginder Singh, Kenyan race car driver (b. 1932)
  2013   – Larri Thomas, American actress and dancer (b. 1932)
  2013   – Sid Yudain, American journalist, founded Roll Call (b. 1923)
2014 – René Burri, Swiss photographer and journalist (b. 1933)
  2014   – Oscar de la Renta, Dominican-American fashion designer (b. 1932)
  2014   – Christophe de Margerie, French businessman (b. 1951)
2015 – Makis Dendrinos, Greek basketball player and coach (b. 1950) 
  2015   – Arno Gruen, German-Swiss psychologist and psychoanalyst (b. 1923)
  2015   – Kazimierz Łaski, Polish-Austrian economist and academic (b. 1921)
  2015   – Michael Meacher, English academic and politician, Secretary of State for the Environment, Transport and the Regions (b. 1939)
  2015   – Ian Steel, Scottish cyclist and manager (b. 1928)
2016 – Robert E. Kramek, former United States Coast Guard admiral (b. 1939)
  2016   – Michael Massee, American actor (b. 1952)
  2016   – Junko Tabei, Japanese mountaineer (b. 1939)
2018 – Wim Kok, Dutch prime minister (b. 1938)
2020 – James Randi, Canadian-American stage magician and author (b. 1928)
2022 – Lucy Simon, American composer and songwriter (b. 1940)

Holidays and observances
Christian feast days:
Acca of Hexham
Aderald
Artemius
Caprasius of Agen
Hedwig (in Canada, moved from Oct. 16)
Irene of Tomar
Magdalene of Nagasaki
Margaret Marie Alacoque (in Canada, moved from Oct. 16)
Maria Bertilla Boscardin
Mater Admirabilis
October 20 (Eastern Orthodox liturgics)
Arbor Day (Czech Republic) 
Heroes' Day (Kenya) 
Revolution Day (Guatemala), one of the two Patriotic Days (Guatemala)
Vietnamese Women's Day (Vietnam)
World Osteoporosis Day 
World Statistics Day

References

External links

 
 
 

Days of the year
October